The Minister for Public Utilities was originally a short lived, independent ministerial title, following a split from the Minister for Commerce, Industry, and Seafaring. It has since been revived by the Second Lars Løkke Rasmussen Cabinet.

List of ministers

References

Lists of government ministers of Denmark
Government ministerial offices of Denmark
1966 establishments in Denmark